Sportverein Sandhausen 1916 e.V., commonly known as simply SV Sandhausen or  Sandhausen, is a German association football club that plays in Sandhausen, immediately to the south of Heidelberg in Baden-Württemberg. It is Germany's smallest professional football club.

The club's greatest success came in 2011–12 when it won the 3. Liga and earned promotion to the 2. Bundesliga for the first time.

History

After a shaky start financially, the club advanced steadily through the lower leagues until it earned promotion to the Bezirksliga Rhein-Saar in 1931, but only played for a single season at that level before descending again. In 1943, it was merged with TSV Walldorf and VfB Wiesloch to form the wartime squad KSG Walldorf-Wiesloch. The combined squad was dissolved at the end of the conflict and SG Sandhausen was reestablished as an independent club late in 1945. A half dozen years later it re-claimed its original name. Sandhausen played football in the Landesliga or 2.Amateurliga until 1956 when it advanced to the 1.Amateurliga Nordbaden. In 1977, the team finished runner up in the German amateur championship and progressed to the Oberliga Baden-Württemberg in 1978 where it consistently earned finishes in the upper half of the table. Sandhausen claimed three Oberliga titles through the 1980s and the German Amateur Championship in 1993. It won back-to-back Oberliga titles in 1995 and 2000 and, with its latest title in 2007, gained promotion to the Regionalliga Süd (III).

Negotiations held in late 2005 and on into early 2006 to merge Sandhausen with TSG 1899 Hoffenheim and FC Astoria Walldorf to create FC Heidelberg 06 were abandoned due to resistance to the idea on the part of both Sandhausen and Walldorf, and the failure to agree on whether the new side's stadium should be located in Heidelberg.

The 2007–08 season was a success for the club, being in contention for 2. Bundesliga promotion almost until the end of season and comfortably qualifying for the new 3. Liga. In 2012, the club won the 3. Liga and thus promotion to the 2. Bundesliga. The club finished its inaugural 2. Bundesliga season in a relegation position but was saved when MSV Duisburg was refused a licence and played a much stronger 2013–14 campaign, finishing 12th.

Players

Current squad

Out on loan

Honours
The club's honours:

League
 German amateur championship
 Champions: 1978, 1993
 Runners-up: 1977
 3. Liga
 Champions: 2012
 Oberliga Baden-Württemberg (III/IV)
 Champions: 1981, 1985, 1987, 1995, 2000, 2007
 Amateurliga Nordbaden (III)
 Champions: 1961

Cup
 North Baden Cup (Tiers III-VII)
 Winners: 1977, 1978, 1981, 1982, 1983, 1985, 1986, 1995, 2006, 2007, 2010‡, 2011
 Runners-up: 1996, 2003, 2009‡
 ‡ Won by reserve team.

Recent managers
Recent managers of the club:

Recent seasons
The recent season-by-season performance of the club:

SV Sandhausen

SV Sandhausen II

 With the introduction of the Regionalligas in 1994 and the 3. Liga in 2008 as the new third tier, below the 2. Bundesliga, all leagues below dropped one tier.

Key

References

External links
 
SV Sandhausen at Weltfussball.de
Das deutsche Fußball-Archiv historical German domestic league tables 

 
Football clubs in Germany
Football clubs in Baden-Württemberg
Association football clubs established in 1916
1916 establishments in Germany
Rhein-Neckar-Kreis
2. Bundesliga clubs
3. Liga clubs